Although prototype diesel locomotives ran in Britain before World War II, the railways of both the Republic and Northern Ireland changed over much more rapidly from steam to diesel traction than those in Britain, due to the island's limited coal reserves and (in the Republic) an ageing steam locomotive fleet.

Northern Ireland operated several diesel shunters as early as the 1930s. 
CIE's first diesels consisted of five shunters built by CIE in 1947/48. 
The initial two diesel mainline locomotives were also built in Inchicore, in 1950/51, and fitted with Sulzer engines and MV traction equipment. This was followed in the mid 1950s with a large order from Britain fitted with Crossley engines, with notably poor results. From the early 1960s, locomotives with more reliable engines from General Motors Electro-Motive Division were adopted.  In the late 1960s the Crossley engines were replaced by EMD 645 units in a major re-enginging programme. Since the early 1960s all new locomotives on the two Irish rail systems have been purchased from EMD, with the exception of three from Hunslet Engine Company of Leeds, England, for NIR in 1970.

Ireland

Mass dieselisation
In 1948, CIÉ commissioned a report from Sir James Milne (General Manager of the British Great Western Railway) on the problems of upgrading its rail services. Despite his recommendation to continue with steam traction, CIÉ decided to push for the complete dieselisation of its railway system, expecting substantial economies of scale.

The first of the two mainline diesel locomotives built by CIÉ at Inchicore Works, each with a Sulzer engine built by Vickers Armstrong, Class 113, entered service in April 1950, following completion of trials.

Subsequently, CIÉ placed one of the largest orders of its time, for 94 locomotives (60 Metro-Vick Class 001, or A Class, and 34 201 Class, or C Class locomotives) with a consortium of four British companies:
 Diesel engines from Crossley. The engine used in the A Class was the Crossley HST V8 of 1,200 horsepower (895 KW), relatively untested for railway use although the same engine was used in the 48 Western Australian Government Railways X and XA class locomotives built by Metropolitan Vickers in 1954-6 and the small build of 20 Type 2 Co-Bo locomotives for British Railways (later British Rail Class 28) of 1958–9
 Mechanicals from Metropolitan Cammell
 Electrical components from both the English Steel Corp. and the Metropolitan-Vickers Electrical Co.

Delivered to Inchicore Works between 1955 and 1958, the Class 001 was to become the mainstay of mainline passenger and freight services on the network for the next forty years. Parts were also ordered for a further 19 locos to be built at Inchicore Works.

From the outset, the two-stroke Crossley engines proved under-powered and unreliable. The 001s were not capable of reliably handling mainline work, while the Class 201, no longer required on branch line work due to Todd Andrews's large scale closures, were unsuited to mainline work because of their low power (c.600 hp).

The General Motors influence
From the early 60s, CIÉ looked to GM, with their history of reliability. 15 121 Class were purchased in 1961. These were modified shunting locos ("switchers") and proved an instant success. One drawback was the single cab construction requiring the loco to be turned at the end of each journey as the drivers refused to operate them "long hood" forward. They were modified in the mid-1970s for multiple unit operation and operated in consist, "long hood" to "long hood", with their cabs at each end. 37 141 Class, delivered in 1962, were fitted with two cabs to overcome this problem. The delivery of these engines brought an end to regular steam working in April 1963. A third batch of GM locomotives (181 Class) were delivered in 1966, which were essentially 141s with more powerful engines.

Having experienced GM's reliability, CIÉ decided in 1964 to fit higher-powered engines in both Class 001 and Class 201 locos. However, GM would only sell complete engine / generator assemblies and would not provide engines on their own. They finally agreed in 1967 to supply engines to enable re-engining of the Class 001. This was the first time that GM supplied engines for such purposes. The trials were a total success and over the next four years, all 94 Metrovicks were fitted with replacement EMD 645 engines.

Eighteen new GM locomotives were delivered in 1977. Visually resembling a stretched 141/181 Class, the new locomotives had a Co-Co wheel arrangement and were of significantly higher power, 2,475 h.p. The 071 Class with its higher speed and power went on to become the principal passenger locomotive on the Irish railway network for the next twenty years. The new 201 Class, again built by GM, superseded them in 1994–1995. These are currently the heaviest, fastest and most powerful diesel locomotives operating in Ireland (112 tons, max. speed 102 mph and 3,200 hp).

Classification
Initially, CIÉ numbered and classified its handful of early diesel locomotives in the same way as steam. However, it soon developed a series based on engine power Types, with the highest-powered locomotives being Type A and numbered in the Axx series, and the lowest powered being Type G and numbered in the G6xx series. Locomotive K801, ex GNRB, was a one-off prototype and did not truly fit in this scheme.

Since all the locomotives were in fact numbered in series, the letter prefix was dropped in 1972, as was the allocation of numbers according to power. Locomotives rebuilt with higher-powered engines were not renumbered, later locomotives simply taking the next available number series.

In the early to mid-1980s, locomotives started to be designated with the letters S and/or A after their number. For example, 124 was renumbered 124SA.

The "S" indicated that the locomotive had been fitted with Continuous Automatic Warning System (CAWS), an in-cab system that displays the aspect of the next signal. Locomotives not fitted with CAWS had restrictions imposed on their use.

The suffix "A" indicated that the locomotive's air brakes had been commissioned. Until the introduction of the Mark 3, all Irish coaching stock used vacuum brakes but all locomotives since the 121 Class had also been equipped with air braking, albeit never commissioned. Only those whose air brakes were commissioned could haul the new coaches.

The suffix letters were dropped once all locomotives had their air brakes commissioned and been fitted with CAWS, and numbering continued as before.

Northern Ireland
A variety of small classes of diesel locomotives have operated on railways in Northern Ireland. From 2001, most items of rolling stock in use on NIR had 8000 added to their number so as to be part of the Translink number series, which also incorporates their road vehicles.

Belfast and County Down Railway (1848–1948)
 2
 28 (later used by NCC)

Northern Counties Committee (1903–1948)
 17 (Designated Class X)
 22

Northern Ireland Railways (since 1967)
 DH class: Numbers 1–3
 DL class: Numbers 101–103
 MV class: Numbers 104–109
 GM class: Numbers 111–113
 201 class: Numbers 208–209

Republic of Ireland

See also
 Coaching Stock of Ireland
 Freight Stock of Ireland
 Multiple Units of Ireland
 Rail transport in Ireland
 Steam Locomotives of Ireland
 History of rail transport in Ireland

References

Sources

Further reading

External links
 Eiretrains – Irish Locomotives
 Colour schemes: CIÉ locomotive livery variations 1960-1990

 
 
Diesel locomotives of Northern Ireland